The Cardiff trolleybus system once served Cardiff, the capital city of Wales.

Trolleybuses are electric buses that draw power from dual overhead wires using spring-loaded trolley poles. By the standards of the other now-defunct trolleybus systems in the United Kingdom, the Cardiff system was medium-sized, with 14 routes and a maximum fleet of 79 trolleybuses.

Four Cardiff trolleybuses have been preserved.  Nos. 243 and 262 are at the Cardiff & South Wales Trolleybus Project in eastern Cardiff, no. 215 is at the National Collections Centre of National Museum Wales, Nantgarw, and no. 203 is at the Trolleybus Museum at Sandtoft, Lincolnshire, England.

See also

Bus transport in Cardiff
History of Cardiff
Transport in Cardiff
List of trolleybus systems in the United Kingdom

References

Notes

Further reading

External links

Cardiff Transport Preservation Group - official site
SCT'61 website - photos and descriptions of Cardiff trolleybuses and early motorbuses
National Trolleybus Archive
British Trolleybus Society, based in Reading
National Trolleybus Association, based in London

Bus transport in Cardiff
Cardiff
Cardiff